Lawrence Township is one of the twenty-two townships of Washington County, Ohio, United States.  The 2000 census found 956 people in the township.

Geography
Located in the eastern part of the county, it borders the following townships:
Liberty Township - north
Independence Township - east
Newport Township - south
Marietta Township - southwest corner
Fearing Township - west
Salem Township - northwest corner

No municipalities are located in Lawrence Township.

Name and history
Statewide, other Lawrence Townships are located in Lawrence, Stark, and Tuscarawas counties.

Northeastern Lawrence Township is the location of the Hune Covered Bridge, which is listed on the National Register of Historic Places.

Government
The township is governed by a three-member board of trustees, who are elected in November of odd-numbered years to a four-year term beginning on the following January 1. Two are elected in the year after the presidential election and one is elected in the year before it. There is also an elected township fiscal officer, who serves a four-year term beginning on April 1 of the year after the election, which is held in November of the year before the presidential election. Vacancies in the fiscal officership or on the board of trustees are filled by the remaining trustees.

References

External links
County website

Townships in Washington County, Ohio
Townships in Ohio